Nefesh B'Nefesh, or Jewish Souls United, a nonprofit organization, promotes, encourages and facilitates aliyah (Jewish immigration to Israel) from the United States, Canada and the United Kingdom. The organization aims to remove or minimize the financial, professional, logistical, and social obstacles that potential olim face. Nefesh B'Nefesh works in close cooperation with the Jewish Agency for Israel, the Government of Israel and major Jewish organizations across various denominations, and assists people of all ages in the pre- and post-aliyah process, offering resources such as financial aid, employment guidance and networking, assistance navigating the Israeli system, social guidance and counseling. Since 2002 Nefesh B'Nefesh has brought over 60,000 olim to Israel. In 2011 Nefesh B'Nefesh co-founder Yehoshua Fass received the Moskowitz Prize for Zionism on behalf of the organization.

History
Nefesh B'Nefesh was originally conceived by Rabbi Yehoshua Fass after a family member was killed in a terrorist attack in Israel on 28 March 2001. Realizing that there were many people who wanted to immigrate to Israel but were concerned about certain obstacles, Rabbi Fass and Florida businessman and philanthropist Tony Gelbart decided to create an organization which would try to make it easier for American Jews to make aliyah.

In the summer of 2002, Nefesh B'Nefesh organized its first chartered aliyah flight. In November 2005, Prime Minister Ariel Sharon authorized government funding for Nefesh B'Nefesh on a trial basis. In May 2006, in response to numerous requests from British Jews interested in aliyah, services were expanded to also include the UK. In December 2006, Nefesh B'Nefesh brought its 10,000th oleh.

In January 2008, Nefesh B'Nefesh, in conjunction with Legacy Heritage Fund, announced provision of significant fellowship grants for physicians making aliyah in order to help counteract a projected shortage of physicians in Israel. In March 2008, with the help of Nefesh B'Nefesh, a Knesset "Lobby for the Encouragement for Aliya from the West" was established. The lobby aims to raise awareness of the unique needs of Western olim and further remove obstacles that they may face during the initial stages of their acclimation.

In August 2008, the Jewish Agency for Israel and Nefesh B'Nefesh created a "one-stop shop" designed to streamline the aliyah process and make it easier for olim. Under the new "collaborative venture" Nefesh B'Nefesh is the primary source responsible for marketing and promoting the concept of aliyah to Jews in North America. The Jewish Agency is responsible for the aliyah eligibility process with the appropriate authorities in Israel. In September 2008, the Israeli government officially recognized Nefesh B'Nefesh in a decision designed to enhance aliyah from Western countries.

In December 2008, Nefesh B'Nefesh, in cooperation with the Israeli government and the Jewish Agency, and with the support of the Russell Berrie Foundation, launched the "Go North" initiative. The initiative presents prospective immigrants with an unprecedented benefits package to help new olim move to Northern Israel. In 2009, oil tycoon Guma Aguiar donated $8 million to the organization. In September 2009, Erez Halfon became Vice Chairman of Nefesh B'Nefesh. Prior to joining the organization, he served as Director General of the Ministry of Immigrant Absorption from 2006 to 2008. In February 2010, the Office of the Prime Minister, Ministry of Immigrant Absorption and Ministry for the Development of the Negev and Galilee agreed to intensify their partnerships with Nefesh B'Nefesh.

In September 2013, Nefesh B'Nefesh's Bonei Zion Prize was established, "in order to formally recognize the achievements of outstanding Anglo olim and their contribution to the State of Israel." A prize is awarded in each of the following categories: Community & non-profit, education, Israel advocacy, science & medicine, young leadership, and culture, art & sports.

Funding
In 2021, Nefesh B'Nefesh received more than 10 million shekels in grants from the Israeli Ministry of Aliyah and Integration.

Services

Nefesh B'Nefesh provides assistance with Israeli bureaucratic procedures and helps olim overcome cultural gaps. The Government Advocacy Department works with governmental and institutional bodies, such as the Ministries of Interior and Immigrant Absorption. The department provides information for olim, such as guides for dealing with government offices and agencies, and information regarding benefits.

Nefesh B'Nefesh provides financial aid to eligible aliyah candidates in order to help defray some of the relocation costs. Nefesh B'Nefesh maintains regular contact with olim prior to aliyah and after arrival in Israel. The organization has an in-house call center and conducts ongoing seminars and workshops, helps families identify suitable communities, and assists students in finding appropriate educational tracks. It also provides a supportive network for singles and retirees. Social Services staff help to address the personal concerns of each oleh prior to aliyah and for some time afterwards.

Nefesh B'Nefesh assists olim in searching for jobs. It provides pre- and post-aliyah employment counseling sessions and matches olimwith professionals in their field, assists in tailoring resumes to the Israeli market, provides information about job retraining, and offers guidance in starting businesses. In addition, the Employment Department lobbies on behalf of various professions which require official licensing. Nefesh B'Nefesh runs several special programs such as Soldier aliyah Fund and Physician aliyah Program. Nefesh B'Nefesh provides chartered and group aliyah flights with El Al Airlines, Israel's official airline. In 2019, the organization launched a 'MedEx' track for prospective immigrants to help smooth the process for medical professionals who were moving to Israel.

The Nefesh B'Nefesh website includes an online application for Nefesh B'Nefesh assistance and Jewish Agency for Israel approval. It also includes the aliyahpedia, a collection of articles about aliyah, helping readers learn about Israeli communities, schools, employment, financial planning and aliyah rights. The website offers additional resources such as an online calendar of events and a library of taped seminars.

Go Beyond-North program

The Go Beyond-North program aims to encourage Jews from North America and the UK to immigrate directly to the northern part of Israel, including the following regions: Galilee, Golan Heights, Jezreel Valley and Upper Jordan Valley. The city of Haifa and its neighboring suburbs (Krayot) are not part of the program. The program dealt with overcoming the concerns that the long distance from the country's center area and lack of development might arouse absorption issues. By ongoing employment assistance, tailor-fitted social programming and a personal guidance system by the local Go Beyond-North staff the transition chances are higher. Applications for the program are reviewed on a case-by-case basis.

Due to the joint venture of the Jewish Agency for Israel and Nefesh B'Nefesh, an oleh can take advantage of a "one-stop shop" offering both aliyah approval and the Go Beyond-North application services. olim who already made aliyah and wish to relocate to the northern region, can apply to the program as well. In 2013 Movin’ On Up! an effort to help olim move from Central Israel to the Go Beyond-North region was initiated. The official goal aimed by the program is settling a total of 1,500 olim in the upper northern part of Israel within a planned period of 5 years.

The financial assistance funds offered to the qualified applicants are pending a three-year period. A residents who leave the region and therefore the project, are required to return up to 50 percent of the awarded funds. In case of leaving Israel and going back abroad, a full fund return will be required. The budget for the initiative stands on the total sum of $10 million US dollars. A major source of the budget is The Russell Berrie Foundation donation, with additional funding from the Government of Israel and the Jewish National Fund.

Go Beyond-South program
Due to the success of the Go Beyond-North program, Nefesh B'Nefesh expanded into the south under their Go Beyond-South program. The primary goal of the Go Beyond-South program is to raise awareness among potential olim about opportunities in the south. The Go Beyond-South program is run by Donna Horwitz.

The southern district of Israel, known as the Negev, makes up 66% of Israel's land, however makes up only 8% of Israel's population. In addition to the regular aliyah benefits, the Go Beyond-South program offers assistance through assistance with financial grants and employment. Additionally they offer local support and networking.

Criticism
In late 2012, the Haaretz newspaper published an investigation that made claims against Nefesh B'Nefesh alleging that the organization has not significantly increased aliyah since its founding, that it has double-billed the government for olim who arrived with the assistance of other organizations, and that its employee salaries were bloated. Nefesh B'Nefesh denied Haaretzs accusations and maintained that government audited figures showed a 140% increase of aliyah in the ten years of the organization's operation, and that another five-year comprehensive government audit found no irregularities or duplication in Nefesh B'Nefesh's invoicing protocol. Nefesh B'Nefesh also stated that its salaries were well within comparative norms and counter claimed that the Haaretz article was politically motivated.

In 2014, writing for The Times of Israel, Haviv Rettig Gur claimed the recent raise in aliyah had "nothing to do with the organization’s laudable work which eased the aliya process for immigrants’ but did nothing to increase their numbers." Gur criticized Nefesh B’Nefesh for taking credit for an increase in aliyah that was already on the rebound. He backed up his claim with official statistics that showed American aliyah was just as high in the mid 1990s and that the post year 2000 peak simply "marked an American aliya that had recovered from the terrorism-driven dip of the previous decade."

Hanukkah flash mob
In 2009 Nefesh B'Nefesh produced a Hanukkah flash mob viral video, registering over one million views on YouTube. The mob assembled on Jerusalem's Ben Yehuda Street and was choreographed by new immigrant Marvin Casey. The participants danced to the song "Hanukkah Hey Ya" by American comedian Eric Schwartz, spoof of an Outkast song "Hey Ya!"

Partners
Nefesh B'Nefesh works in partnership with the following organizations:
Am Yisrael Foundation
Friends of the Israel Defense Forces
The Irving Moskowitz Foundation
Jewish Agency for Israel
Jewish National Fund
Legacy Heritage Fund
Marcus Foundation
Ministry for the Development of the Negev and Galilee
Ministry of Immigrant Absorption
Prime Minister's Office
Russell Berrie Foundation

See also

American Zionist Movement
Birthright Israel
Zionist Organization of America
Yom Haaliyah

References

Further reading

External links

Nefesh B'Nefesh at the Jewish National Fund
Nefesh B'Nefesh at Arutz Sheva

501(c)(3) organizations
Aliyah
Diaspora organizations
Immigrant services organizations
International organizations based in Israel
Jewish charities based in Israel
Non-profit organizations based in Israel
Organizations based in Jerusalem
Organizations established in 2001
Zionist organizations